In Japan, a  is a washbasin provided at the entrance to a holy place for visitors to purify themselves by the ritual washing of hands and rinsing of the mouth.  This type of ritual cleansing is the custom for guests attending a tea ceremony  or visiting the grounds of a Buddhist temple. The name originates from the verb , meaning "to crouch" or "to bow down", an act of humility. Guests attending a tea ceremony crouch and wash their hands in a  set in the tea garden (roji) before entering the tearoom.

 are usually of stone, and are often provided with a small ladle, ready for use.

The famous  shown here stands in the grounds of the Ryōan-ji temple in Kyoto, and was donated by the feudal lord Tokugawa Mitsukuni. The kanji written on the surface of the stone are without significance when read alone. The underlying meaning, variously translated as "what one has is all one needs", or "learn only to be content" reflects the basic anti-materialistic teachings of Buddhism.

See also
, a musical cave to drain handwashing water
Chōzuya (or ), a Shinto water ablution pavilion
Ritual purification

References

External links

Tsukubai Design & Construction - Tea instructor Elliot Mitchnick discusses the design and construction of the Tsukubai arrangement. 

Chadō
Japanese style of gardening
Buddhist rituals
Water and religion
Ritual purification